The R Broadway/Fourth Avenue Local is a rapid transit service in the B Division of the New York City Subway. Its route emblem, or "bullet", is colored  since it uses the BMT Broadway Line in Manhattan.

The R operates local between 71st Avenue in Forest Hills, Queens and 95th Street in Bay Ridge, Brooklyn at all times except nights, when it short turns at Whitehall Street–South Ferry in Lower Manhattan from Brooklyn. The R runs via Queens Boulevard in Queens, Broadway in Manhattan, and Fourth Avenue in Brooklyn. One northbound a.m. rush hour trip terminates at 96th Street on the Upper East Side of Manhattan instead of 71st Avenue in Queens.

The R was originally the Brooklyn–Manhattan Transit Corporation's 2 service, running along the BMT Fourth Avenue Line in Brooklyn then traveling through the Montague Street Tunnel to Manhattan, then running local on the BMT Broadway Line. The 2 became the RR in 1961. The RR ran local along the BMT Astoria Line in Queens, terminating at Astoria–Ditmars Boulevard until it switched terminals with the N in 1987. The RR became the R in 1985. After 1987, the R ran via the IND Queens Boulevard Line to Forest Hills, Queens. A variant of the RR/R, from Bay Ridge to Chambers Street in Lower Manhattan via the BMT Nassau Street Line, ran from 1967 until 1987.

History

Early history 

The current R service is the successor to the original route 2 of the Brooklyn–Manhattan Transit Corporation. When 2 service began on January 15, 1916, it ran between Chambers Street on the BMT Nassau Street Line and 86th Street on the BMT Fourth Avenue Line, using the Manhattan Bridge to cross the East River, and running via Fourth Avenue local. Service on the BMT Broadway Line, which at the time ran only between Whitehall Street–South Ferry and Times Square–42nd Street, began exactly two years later on January 15, 1918. On July 10, 1919, service was extended to 57th Street–Seventh Avenue with the opening of that station.

The Montague Street Tunnel and the 60th Street Tunnel both opened on August 1, 1920. At that time, the 2 service was rerouted from the Manhattan Bridge to the Montague Street Tunnel, running local from Queensboro Plaza in Queens to 86th Street–Fourth Avenue in Brooklyn. The Bay Ridge–95th Street station opened on October 31, 1925, and became the service's new southern terminus. During this time, rush-hour specials to Chambers Street were sporadically added and removed, eventually becoming an addition to the line. At one time, including during 1931, additional midday service operated local between 57th Street and Whitehall Street–South Ferry. The 2 also used the Nassau Street Loop during rush hours, entering Manhattan via the Manhattan Bridge or Montague Street Tunnel and leaving via the other.

On October 17, 1949, the platform edges on the BMT Astoria Line had been shaved back to accommodate the larger BMT trains, and the BMT's Astoria Shuttle was replaced with service from the 2 Fourth Avenue Line operating from Astoria–Ditmars Boulevard in Astoria, Queens to Bay Ridge–95th Street in Brooklyn at all times. On June 29, 1950, special rush hour trains began running between Bay Ridge–95th Street and Chambers Street via the south side of the Manhattan Bridge and/or the Montague Street Tunnel. The special rush hour trains were discontinued two years later. On June 28, 1952, special service from 95th Street to the Nassau Street Line was discontinued on Saturdays.

1960s–1970s changes 

In the winter of 1960–61, letter designations started to appear on the route with the introduction of the R27s, which featured it on roll signs. The route was labeled the RR "Fourth Avenue Local via Tunnel". This was in accordance with the Independent Subway System's lettering system, which gave double letters to local trains and single letters to express trains. On January 1, 1961, the RR's northern terminus was relocated to its current location at Forest Hills–71st Avenue, via the BMT 60th Street Tunnel Connection, also known as the "11th Street Cut", and the IND Queens Boulevard Line. Night and weekend RR trains still terminated at 57th Street in Manhattan. Evening rush hour Fourth Avenue–Nassau trains went back to the routing that was used prior to 1959, in which trains ran from Broad Street to 95th Street via the Manhattan Bridge, and the Fourth Avenue express tracks.

On November 27, 1967, the day after the Chrystie Street Connection opened, the RR was moved back to Astoria–Ditmars Boulevard on the BMT Astoria Line. Replacing it on the Queens Boulevard Line was the new EE service, running weekdays only between Forest Hills–71st Avenue and Whitehall Street (with additional trains terminating at Canal Street). The Nassau Street specials, which could no longer run as a loop via the Manhattan Bridge, were through-routed from Bay Ridge–95th Street to 168th Street in Jamaica as RJ, along the route used today by the J and Z services. Under the first color scheme, RR was colored green and RJ was red. In the original Chrystie Street routing plans, the TA planned to totally eliminate the RR service, and maintain the RJ route as the main Bay Ridge service.

The RJ designation was only used from November 1967 until July 1, 1968, when it was cut back to Chambers Street and renamed as additional RR rush-hour peak-direction service. Because track connections between the Nassau Street Loop and the south tracks of the Manhattan Bridge were severed as part of the construction of the Chrystie Street Connection, these trains could not run in a loop anymore. On August 30, 1976, the EE was discontinued, with the N being extended to Forest Hills on weekdays to replace it.

On January 24, 1977, as part of a series of NYCTA service cuts to save $13 million, many subway lines began running shorter trains during middays. As part of the change, RR trains began running with six cars between 10:45 a.m. and 2:05 p.m.

In 1979, the MTA released a revised coloring scheme; RR service was assigned the color yellow (because it used the BMT Broadway Line). Although BMT Nassau Street Line services were colored brown, the rush hour RR service that used the Nassau Street Line was colored yellow, using a diamond bullet. The RR service via Nassau Street was referred to as the "Chambers Street Special".

1980s-2000s changes 

On May 6, 1985, the MTA eliminated double letters for local service; the RR became the R. R service on the Broadway Line continued to use a yellow bullet, while the special Chambers Street–Bay Ridge rush-hour service was signed with a brown diamond with a white R inside, matching the J and M services using the BMT Nassau Street Line.

Starting on April 28, 1986, R service on the Nassau Street Line was extended to Metropolitan Avenue for layups and put-ins from Fresh Pond Yard. After the N/R swap, the Nassau R used East New York Yard equipment. This rush hour service was discontinued on November 20, 1987.

On May 24, 1987, the northern terminals of the N and R were swapped. The swap placed the R along the IND Queens Boulevard Line to Forest Hills–71st Avenue once again, with the N replacing it in Astoria. The change was made to give the R direct access to the Jamaica Yard (where the train is assigned to this day), and previously, R trains had to make non-passenger runs, or "deadheads", to/from the Coney Island Yard. As part of the reroute plan, F service along Queens Boulevard was discontinued during late nights (1 a.m. to 5 a.m.). Late night local service was replaced by the R, which ran as a Queens Boulevard Local at all times. F trains were cut back to 57th Street on the Sixth Avenue Line during late nights. In 1986, the TA studied which two services should serve the line during late nights as ridership at this time did not justify three services. A public hearing was held in December 1986, and it was determined that having the E and R run during late nights provided the best service.

On December 11, 1988, the Archer Avenue Lines opened, and the E was rerouted to its current terminus at Jamaica Center via the Queens Boulevard Line's express tracks. E trains began running express east of Continental Avenue, skipping 75th Avenue and Van Wyck Boulevard at all times. The R was extended from Continental Avenue to 179th Street to provide local service; this allowed F trains to continue running express to 179th Street, and F trains skipped 169th Street between 10 a.m. and 3:30 p.m. During the morning rush hour, four R trains went into service at Continental Avenue, because local ridership from 179th Street during rush hours did not warrant it. All R trains went to 179th Street during the afternoon rush to avoid taking loaded R trains out of service at Continental Avenue.

Two service plans were identified prior to a public hearing on February 25, 1988 concerning the service plan for the new extension. The first would have split rush-hour E service between the two branches, with late night service to 179th Street provided by the R, while the second would have had all E trains run via Archer Avenue and would have extended R locals to 179th Street. A modified version of the second plan was decided upon: some E trains would run from 179th Street instead of Archer Avenue during morning rush hours, though all E trains would run to Archer Avenue during the afternoon rush hour to reduce confusion for Queens-bound riders.

The 1988 changes angered some riders because they resulted in the loss of direct Queens Boulevard Express service at local stations east of 71st Avenue—namely the 169th Street, Sutphin Boulevard, Van Wyck Boulevard and 75th Avenue stations. Local elected officials pressured the MTA to eliminate all-local service at these stations. As part of service cuts on September 30, 1990, the R was cut back to 71st–Continental Avenues outside of rush hours. Local service to 179th Street was replaced by F trains, which provided Queens Boulevard Express service, during middays, evenings, and weekends. Late-night R service became a shuttle between 36th Street/Fourth Avenue and Bay Ridge–95th Street in Brooklyn, and service along Queens Boulevard to 179th Street was replaced by G service.

In 1992, the MTA considered three options to improve service at these local stops, including leaving service as is, having E trains run local east of 71st Avenue along with R service, and having F trains run local east of 71st Avenue replacing R service, which would be cut back to 71st Avenue at all times. The third option was chosen to be tested for six months starting in October or November 1992. On October 26, 1992, R trains were cut back to 71st Avenue at all times, and in its place, the F ran local east of 71st Avenue at all times, thus eliminating express service along Hillside Avenue. After the six months, the change was kept because there was minimal negative passenger reaction and because of the intensity of the request, even though 77% of passengers had benefited from the pre-October 1992 service plan. The change increased travel time along the F by  minutes, and reduced travel time for passengers at local stations by one to two minutes.

In October 2000, late-night shuttle trains in Brooklyn began skipping 53rd Street and 45th Street in the northbound direction. This was so shuttle trains could terminate more quickly at 36th Street–Fourth Avenue, their northern terminal. Previously, all northbound B, N, and R trains had stopped at the same track at 36th Street, which resulted in delays because it took several minutes for the R trains to be cleared.

On September 11, 2001, after the attack on the World Trade Center, the BMT Broadway Line was damaged, and the R service was cut back to run only south of Court Street. On September 17, R service was completely suspended, being replaced with  service in Brooklyn and  service in Manhattan and Queens. All three trains returned to normal service by October 28. Effective December 16, 2001, to accommodate new V service, the frequency of R service during the morning rush hour was decreased, with trains running every six minutes instead of every five minutes.

On September 8, 2002, Coney Island–Stillwell Avenue was closed for reconstruction. As a result, late night R service was extended to Pacific Street, running express between that station and 36th Street. On April 27, 2003, the frequency of Saturday morning and afternoon service was decreased, with trains running every 12 minutes instead of every 8 minutes. Trains also ran every 12 minutes on Sunday mornings and afternoons, instead of every 15 and 12 minutes on Sunday mornings, and every 10 and 8 minutes on Sunday afternoons. Late night service was cut back to 36th Street when the north side of the Manhattan Bridge reopened on February 22, 2004.

2010s changes 
After Hurricane Sandy flooded the subway system, the Montague Street Tunnel was completely flooded. When service was restored, the R train was split into two sections (between Forest Hills and 34th Street–Herald Square at all times except late nights, and between Jay Street–MetroTech and Bay Ridge–95th Street at all times). On December 4, the Queens–Manhattan section was extended to Whitehall Street–South Ferry. On December 21, full service was restored between Manhattan and Brooklyn after the Montague Street Tubes were drained.

However, from August 2, 2013, to fall 2014, the tunnel was closed again so that extra repairs could be completed, bringing back similar storm changes to the R train. On weekdays, the divided R ran in two sections: one section between Forest Hills and Whitehall Street–South Ferry, and the other between Court Street and Bay Ridge–95th Street. On weekends, the R train ran its full route via the Manhattan Bridge, skipping all stations between Canal Street and DeKalb Avenue. The weekday service between Forest Hills and Whitehall Street essentially recreated the former EE route from 1967 to 1976. Originally slated to open by October 2014, the tunnel reopened a few weeks early, on September 15, 2014, and several million dollars under budget.

On June 16, 2016, it was announced that late-night R service would be extended north to Whitehall Street in order to provide a one-seat ride into Manhattan. This eliminated the need for northbound trains to skip 45th Street and 53rd Street as R trains no longer needed to reverse on the express tracks at 36th Street. The change took place on November 5, 2016. During late weekend evenings, every other R train short turned at Whitehall Street, resulting in waiting time doubling along the entire Brooklyn portion of the route. As part of the changes, these short-turns were extended to 95th Street.

Starting November 6, 2017, one northbound R trip was diverted to serve the then-new Second Avenue Subway in order to increase service on that line during the morning rush hour. In February 2019, in the midst of a transit crisis, several Bay Ridge politicians proposed splitting the R route in half, similar to the pattern enacted during the Montague Street Tunnel closures in 2013 and 2014, citing the route's length and unreliability. This proposal has been met with criticism from local riders, mostly because it would eliminate a one-seat ride into Manhattan.

Route

Service pattern 
The following table shows the lines used by the R, with shaded boxes indicating the route at the specified times:

Stations 

For a more detailed station listing, see the articles on the lines listed above.

References

External links 

 MTA New York City Transit – R Broadway Local
 
 

New York City Subway services